Leslie Wilson (16 March 1859 – 15 April 1944) was an English first-class cricketer active 1883–97 who played for Kent (awarded county cap 1883). He was born in Canonbury and died in Hastings.

References

1859 births
1944 deaths
English cricketers
Kent cricketers
Marylebone Cricket Club cricketers
Gentlemen of England cricketers
North v South cricketers
C. I. Thornton's XI cricketers